The 1962 Houston Cougars football team was an American football team that represented the University of Houston as an independent during the 1962 NCAA University Division football season. In its first season under head coach Bill Yeoman, the team compiled a 7–4 record and defeated Miami (OH) in the 1962 Tangerine Bowl. Billy Roland and Bobby Brezina were the team captains. The team played its home games at Rice Stadium in Houston.

Schedule

References

Houston
Houston Cougars football seasons
Citrus Bowl champion seasons
Houston Cougars football